La Thành Station is a metro station in Hanoi, located in Đống Đa, Hanoi.

Station layout

Line 2A

References

External links
La Thành Station

Hanoi Metro stations
Railway stations in Vietnam opened in 2021